Balaguda, is a village and gram panchayat Mandsaur district in the Indian state of Madhya Pradesh. This village is declared as Aaadarsh gram in Sansad Adarsh Gram Yojana scheme.

Demographics 
Balaguda had a population of 2,612.

Transports 
Balaguda Village is well connected with roads, is situated on Pipliya-Balaguda-Pratapgarh(R.J) Road. It is 8 km from Pipliya Mandi. Balaguda is 6 km away from Bahi Chaupati located on Ajmer-Lebad National Highway-79/Mhow-Neemuch SH-31.

References

Villages in Mandsaur district